Bishop Blanchet High School is a private coeducational Catholic high school located north of Green Lake in Seattle, United States. The school was founded in 1954 by the Archdiocese of Seattle, and named for the first bishop of the diocese, A.M.A. Blanchet (1797–1887). Originally named Blanchet High School, in 1999 the title Bishop was added to make the school easily identified as Catholic.

Bishop Blanchet has an enrollment of approximately 850 students, 60% of whom are Catholic.
The school employs 73 teachers, 69 of them full-time. Most students come from Archdiocesan elementary and middle schools.

Academics
Bishop Blanchet High School offers Honors and Advanced Placement courses, which are attended by around 50% of its student body. In order to graduate, a student must acquire 52 credits. However, the school does not provide a Running Start program. According to the Blanchet Admissions Office, approximately 99% of Bishop Blanchet graduates continue their education at higher institutions.

History 
The school was founded in February 1954, and opened in 1955. The school underwent minor renovations in 2002 and 2013.

Extracurricular activities 
Blanchet has a range of sports, clubs, and activities. Most students at Blanchet partake in some kind of extracurricular activity. Several student retreats are offered, including a four-day Kairos retreat.

The Miter 
Bishop Blanchet's student newspaper, The Miter, is published every month during the school year. Articles are published on the newspaper's website.

Athletics 
Blanchet has 36 teams in 17 interscholastic sports, and as of March 2016 had won 164 League Championships. Sports played include cross country, football, basketball, track, soccer, swimming, lacrosse, baseball, bowling, and ping pong. It has won state championships in the following sports:

 Baseball (1): 1996
 Boys Basketball (1): 1963
 Girls Basketball (2): 1995, 1996
 Boys Cross Country (9): 1983, 1984, 1986, 1991, 1992, 2001, 2002, 2004, 2021
 Football (1): 1974
 Boys Soccer (2): 1974, 1980
 Softball (1): 1980
 Volleyball (4): 1991, 2004, 2006, 2009

Athletic scholarship scandal
In 2015, Bishop Blanchet High School's athletics program came under scrutiny for self-reported violations to the Washington Interscholastic Activities Association's recruiting policies. The head coach of the Blanchet football team had established a scholarship program using school funds to offer scholarships to athletes who would otherwise be ineligible for financial aid.

The WIAA responded by expunging the records of the girls' basketball and football teams for several previous seasons, placing the school's athletic program on a two-year probation, and terminating the employment of the head football coach.

Arts 
Bishop Blanchet High School provides a range of artistic courses for its students, including band, choir, drama, and visual arts. The Drama department boasts a "black box" theater within the school premises, which serves as the venue for the fall play, one acts, improv classes, and rehearsals. Additionally, every spring, Blanchet presents a musical at the Moore Theatre. Notably, in 2008, the school's Drama Program was recognized by Stage Directions Magazine as "The Top High School Theatre Program in the Northwest."

Notable alumni 

 Jon Jon Augustavo – filmmaker and music video director
 Caprice Benedetti – actress
 Gillian d'Hondt – professional basketball player
 Bob Ferguson (1983) – lawyer, activist; current Attorney General of Washington
 Bianca Kajlich(1995) – actress 
 Jake Lamb (2009) – baseball player (Los Angeles Dodgers)
 Tom Lampkin – baseball player (Seattle Mariners)
 Thayne McCulloh – President, Gonzaga University
 Ellis McLoughlin (2008) – soccer player (San Jose Earthquakes)
 Rick Redman (1961) – football player and coach (San Diego Chargers)
 Pat Shanahan (1980) – former Boeing executive and former acting United States Secretary of Defense
 Josh Sale (2010) – baseball player (Tampa Bay Rays)
 Joe Steele (1975) - football player
 Joseph J. Tyson (1975) – Bishop, Diocese of Yakima
 Tom Workman (1963) – former NBA basketball player (St. Louis Hawks, Baltimore Bullets)

References

Educational institutions established in 1954
High schools in King County, Washington
Schools in Seattle
Catholic secondary schools in Washington (state)
High schools within the Archdiocese of Seattle
1954 establishments in Washington (state)